Tarbela lake is a reservoir formed by the Tarbela Dam, situated at a distance of 3 km on the south of Haripur, in the Khyber Pakhtunkhwa province of Pakistan.

The fish of Tarbela Lake are distinguished for their particular taste.

Recreation
"Visiting picnic spots and eating out, especially during public holidays," is a popular pastime.

References

External links

 http://www.g/tarbela.html
https://web.archi

Lakes of Khyber Pakhtunkhwa
Haripur District